Dr. Peter Werfft-Wessely (Wien, 8 October 1904 – 23 July 1970), an Austrian chemist, was a Luftwaffe fighter ace in World War II, and a chemical industry entrepreneur after the war. He was also a recipient of the Knight's Cross of the Iron Cross. The Knight's Cross of the Iron Cross was awarded to recognise extreme battlefield bravery or successful military leadership.

Luftwaffe ace in World War II 
As a Gefreiter flying with I/JG 27 Werfft participated in the Battle of Britain; the two air victories which he scored against RAF Hawker Hurricane fighters on 27 September 1940 was his first.

Werrft served with JG 27 in North Africa during 1941–42, claiming five kills over the Desert Air Force. Werfft was commissioned as a Leutnant (Lieutenant) in late 1942. Service over Greece and the Balkans followed in 1943, where he claimed the destruction of a P-38 Lightning and three USAAF heavy bombers.

Werfft claimed 11 more heavies in 1944, he was a Hauptmann (Captain) by October 1944. He was awarded the Ritterkreuz on 28 January 1945.

At the end of World War II he was a Major and gruppenkommandeur of III./JG 27, flying a Messerschmitt Bf 109 G-6 fighter ("Yellow One") with a green fuselage band signifying dedication to Reich strategic airspace defence; he also had a total of 26 air kills.

On 3 May 1945 he disbanded his III./JG 27 in the Austrian Alps near Saalbach, together with the acting unit commander Hauptmann Emil Clade, eventually becoming a prisoner of war of the United States.

Pharmaceutical entrepreneur 
Returning to Austria after his release from captivity, Werfft established InterChemie GmbH, a Vienna-based pharmaceutical and chemical limited liability enterprise, in 1948. Among the first commercial activities of the fledgling trading company in this difficult post-war period was the Austrian sales representation for certain American Cyanamid products. By 1961 the firm had been restructured into a successor company, Werfft-Chemie GmbH. In the years following the founder's death in 1970, Werfft-Chemie continued, initially as a family-run business, but met with increasing economic difficulties. It was taken over by the Austrian Sanochemia Pharmazeutika Group in 1983 and was subsequently converted to a purely veterinary medicine company. The legacy of Werfft-Chemie survived until January 2020 under the name Alvetra u. Werfft AG, a Sanochemia Group company with subsidiaries in several central and eastern European countries; its business assets were acquired by Inovet, another European veterinary company.

Summary of career

Aerial victory claims 
Werfft was credited with 26 enemy aircraft shot down, all of which on the Western Front, including five in North Africa. This figure includes 14 four-engined bombers.

Awards 
 Iron Cross (1939) 2nd and 1st class
 Honour Goblet of the Luftwaffe (Ehrenpokal der Luftwaffe) on 15 July 1944
 German Cross in Gold on 23 July 1944 as Leutnant in the III./Jagdgeschwader 27
 Knight's Cross of the Iron Cross on 28 January 1945 as Hauptmann and Gruppenkommandeur of the III./Jagdgeschwader 27

Notes

References

Citations

Bibliography 

 
 
 
 
 
 

20th-century Austrian businesspeople
Austrian chemists
Austrian aviators
Luftwaffe pilots
German World War II flying aces
Recipients of the Gold German Cross
Recipients of the Knight's Cross of the Iron Cross
Scientists from Vienna
1904 births
1970 deaths
20th-century Austrian scientists
20th-century chemists
Businesspeople from Vienna
Military personnel from Vienna